= Juno in the Clouds =

Painting by Giambattista Tiepolo

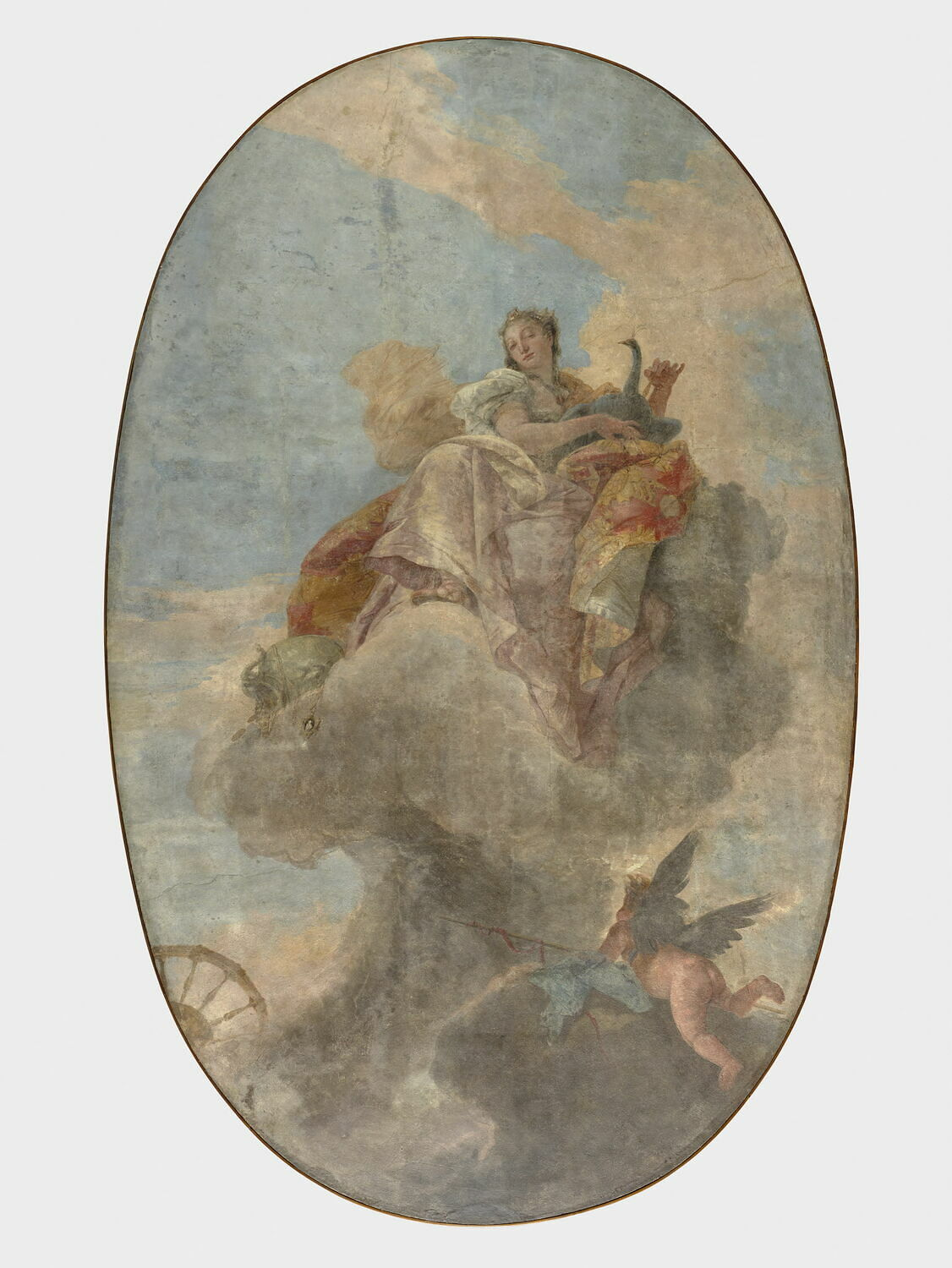
Juno in the Clouds (c. 1735) by Giovanni Battista Tiepolo

Juno in the Clouds is a c.1735 oval painting by Giovanni Battista Tiepolo, bought from a private owner for the Louvre Museum in 2020. It shows Juno and her peacock in a cloud, with a putto below. Originally painted in fresco on the ceiling of the Palazzo Sagredo in Venice, it was transferred to canvas early in the 20th century.
